Life on the Moon may refer to:

Extraterrestrial life on the Moon
Colonization of the Moon
Il mondo della luna, an opera buffa written by Joseph Haydn